Onifai is a comune (municipality) in the Province of Nuoro in the Italian region of Sardinia, located about  north of Cagliari, about  east of Nuoro and just  inland from the gulf of Orosei. The economy is based on agriculture and shepherding. Onifai is well known for its pecorino cheese (most production is exported to the European continent, United States and Canada) and  vernaccia wine made with Cannonau grapes.

Onifai borders the following municipalities: Galtellì, Irgoli, Orosei, Siniscola.

Demographic evolution

References 

Cities and towns in Sardinia